Winnebago County Courthouse may refer to:

Winnebago County Courthouse (Iowa), Forest City, Iowa
Winnebago County Courthouse (Wisconsin), Oshkosh, Wisconsin, listed on the National Register of Historic Places